Anna Francisca de Bruyns (1604, in Morialmé – 1675, in Arras) was a Flemish Baroque painter. She was born in 1604 in Morialmé (near Dinant, in the province of Namur). Here, her father, Cornilla de Bruyns was bailiff. Born into an upper middle class family and raised by outstanding court artists who happened to be her relatives, De Bruyns is one of many women artists of her time, and while there is not a lot on her in English, she is one of the best documented of her peers. She was taught to paint by her older cousin, Jacques Francart. She was painting by the age of seventeen and is said to have surpassed many painters of her time.

Career as an artist 

At as young as eleven, Anna Francisca de Bruyns was displaying talent and interest in the arts. In March 1616, de Bruyns made a masterly copy of a print of Mamluke horsemen by Jan Swart van Groningen. She also made pen and ink copies of pious prints such as depictions of the Virgin. Once she had acquired a level of skill in drawing she was sent to Brussels to sharpen her skills under the mentorship of her cousin Jacques Francqart. He was very serious with his tutoring and by 1622, at the age of seventeen, de Bruyns made a portrait of Francart on a silver plate. Francart also introduced Anna Francisca to the Infanta Isabella Clara Eugenia, showing her the portrait she made of him. and she was so impressed that Anna was commissioned fifteen small paintings of the Mysteries of the Rosary, which were sent as a gift to Pope Paul V. After marriage, it became much harder for her to find time to paint, but she still managed to.

Family 
As mentioned previously, Anna Francisca de Bruyns was born into an upper middle class family and surrounded by court artists. This gave her unusual opportunities to develop her artistic craft. In 1613 her cousin, Jacques Francart, was appointed court painter to the Archdukes Albert and Isabella, and on 27 July 1622 he became Royal Architect-Engineer to Philip IV of Spain. Anna's father, Cornilla de Bruyns, was bailiff of Morialmé from before she was born until moving to Mons where he became superintendent of the Bergh van Bermherticheyt (translated as public pawnshop) which was an institution founded many years earlier by Wenceslas Cobergher. Cobergher was a leading engineer, architect, painter, and numismatist of the time. Cobergher entered the service of the Archdukes who paid him three times as much as they would Rubens and was included in Anthony va Dyck's Iconography, a series of engraved portraits of the most well-known contemporary intellectuals, noblemen, and artists, which speaks to his prestige.

On May 30th 1628 in the Church of Saint-Germain in Mons, Anna married Isaac Bullart--a well-regarded Dutch-born writer--when she was twenty-four years old. They met while Anna was studying under Francart. Bullart actually struggled to win Anna's heart at first, as she was not very social. But he was "charmed as much by the beauty of her art as by the loveliness of her face" and she eventually consented and her parents approved. They had 12 children, one being Jacques Ignace Bullart. One year after their marriage she followed him to Arras, where on April 23rd he was named the superintendent of the Mount of Piety. Their first born was born two weeks prior, and was named Wenceslas, after Wenceslas Cobergher, who helped Bullart get his job as superintendent. Sadly, he died in infancy. Bullart studied at the Jesuit College in Bordeaux and spent thirty years collecting material for his Académie des Sciences et des Arts, which contains 279 biographies of scholars and artists and is one of the most important biographical compendia of the seventeenth century. Bullart was even made a Chevalier de l'Ordre de Saint-Michel (Knight of the order of St.Michael) by Anne of Austria, Regent of France for her son Louis XIV in 1647.

References

External links
 M. Benisovich, "Biographie d'Anne-Françoise de Bruyns, peintre, ecrite par Jacques Ignace Bullart son fils", Oud-Holland 68 (1953), pp. 179–182
 Anna Francisca de Bruyns on Artnet

1604 births
1675 deaths
Flemish Baroque painters
Belgian women painters
People from Florennes
17th-century women artists